Irmak Nature Park is a nature park located in Sarıyer district of Istanbul Province, Turkey.

Irmak Nature Park is situated across Kirazlıbent Nature Park inside the Belgrad Forest and is west of Bahçeköy, Sarıyer. The area was declared a nature park by the Ministry of Environment and Forest in 2011, and is one of the nine nature parks inside the Belgrad Forest. The protected area is named 
for the creek running through the protected area.

The nature park offers outdoor recreation activities such as hiking, cycling and picnicing for visitors on daily basis.[2] There are playgrounds for children. Admission is charged for visitors and vehicles.

Ecosystem
Flora
Vegetation of the nature park is dense wood of deciduous trees comprising sessile oak (Quercus petraea), Kasnak oak (Quercus vulcanica), hornbeam (Carpinus betulus), European alder (Alnus glutinosa), sweet chestnut (Castanea sativa), blackthorn (Prunus spinosa), laurestine (Viburnum tinus), common ivy (Hedera helix), butcher's-broom (Ruscus aculeatus) and blackberry (Rubus).

Fauna
Animals mainly observed in the Belgrad Forest are wild boar, golden jackal, deer, roe deer, fox, gray wolf, marten, hare, squirrel, porcupine, wood mouse, the reptile tortoise and the bird species buzzard, hawk, magpie, crow, woodpecker, passer, finch and goldfinch.

See also
 Ayvat Bendi Nature Park
 Bentler Nature Park
 Falih Rıfkı Atay Nature Park
 Fatih Çeşmesi Nature Park
 Kirazlıbent Nature Park
 Kömürcübent Nature Park
 Mehmet Akif Ersoy Nature Park
 Neşet Suyu Nature Park

References

Nature parks in Turkey
Protected areas established in 2011
2011 establishments in Turkey
Parks in Istanbul
Sarıyer
Belgrad Forest